Goodenia glomerata is a species of flowering plant in the family Goodeniaceae and is endemic to the south coast of New South Wales. It is an erect, hairy herb with elliptic to lance-shaped leaves, mostly at the base of the plant, and compact spikes of hairy yellow flowers.

Description

Taxonomy
Goodenia glomerata was first formally described in 1900 by Joseph Maiden and Ernst Betche in the Proceedings of the Linnean Society of New South Wales.

Distribution and habitat
This goodenia in swampy ground on sandstone and conglomerate from Jervis Bay to Ulladulla and inland to the Budawang Range.

References

glomerata
Flora of New South Wales
Asterales of Australia
Taxa named by Joseph Maiden
Taxa named by Ernst Betche
Plants described in 1900
Endemic flora of Australia